The Hanzhong Campaign was a military campaign launched by the warlord Liu Bei to seize control of Hanzhong Commandery from his rival, Cao Cao. The campaign took place between 217 and 219 during the prelude to the Three Kingdoms period. Although Cao Cao's forces had settled in Hanzhong Commandery three years prior after the Battle of Yangping, they were worn out by an overall Fabian strategy employed by Liu Bei's forces, who used targeted attacks to capture strategic locations from the enemy. One of these attacks resulted in the death of Xiahou Yuan, one of Cao Cao's top generals, delivering a huge blow to the morale of Cao Cao's forces. Due to logistical and other issues, Cao Cao was eventually forced to abandon Hanzhong Commandery and order a retreat. Liu Bei emerged victorious in the campaign and occupied Hanzhong Commandery in 219, after which he declared himself "King of Hanzhong" in autumn of that year.

Background

In 215, Cao Cao attacked the warlord Zhang Lu in Hanzhong Commandery, defeating the latter at the Battle of Yangping. Zhang Lu surrendered and Hanzhong Commandery came under Cao Cao's control.

On Liu Bei's side, he had also recently seized control of Yi Province (covering present-day Sichuan and Chongqing) from Liu Zhang, and was in the midst of a dispute with his ally Sun Quan over Jing Province (covering present-day Hubei and Hunan). Liu Bei felt threatened when he received news that Hanzhong Commandery had fallen to Cao Cao, because Hanzhong was the northern "gateway" into Yi Province and he was now in danger of losing Yi Province to Cao Cao. Hence, Liu Bei came to a border treaty with Sun Quan, who had seized Changsha, Guiyang and Lingling commanderies in southern Jing Province from him. Liu Bei asked Sun Quan to divert Cao Cao's attention by attacking Hefei and demanded Lingling Commandery back. In return, he recognised Sun Quan's control over Changsha, Jiangxia and Guiyang commanderies.

Strategic difference
In Hanzhong Commandery, Sima Yi and Liu Ye urged Cao Cao to use the opportunity to attack Yi Province, but Cao Cao rejected the idea, saying, "We should not be discontent. Now that we've already conquered Longyou (referring to present-day eastern Gansu), you're still longing about merging Shu (referring to Yi Province)!" Cao Cao then left his generals Xiahou Yuan, Zhang He and Xu Huang behind to defend Hanzhong Commandery, and his Chief Clerk Du Xi to oversee the commandery's military affairs.

In 217, Liu Bei's adviser Fa Zheng analysed the reason Cao Cao left Xiahou Yuan to guard Hanzhong Commandery and didn't push to conquer Yi province was not because of a lack of strength or insight but because he met some internal problems and was needed back to the capital. Fa Zheng also believed that Xiahou Yuan and Zhang He's ability didn't match those of Liu Bei's commanders, so the pair could not defend Hanzhong Commandery. Hence, Fa Zheng urged Liu Bei to attack Hanzhong Commandery, stating three benefits if the commandery could be taken: ideally it could serve as a base of operations to attack Cao Cao and revive the Han dynasty; if that were not possible one could still attack Yong and Liang provinces from it (Hanzhong Commandery granted access to the two provinces) and expand his territory; and finally Hanzhong Commandery had long-lasting strategical impact on the survival of Liu Bei's regime. Liu Bei agreed with Fa Zheng's analysis and ordered him to plan for the upcoming campaign.

The campaign

Initial clashes

In 217, Huang Quan defeated the Wei forces led by Pu Hu, Du Huo, Yuan Yue (袁約) along with others whom Cao Cao had appointed as Administrators of the three Ba commandaries and seized control of Badong, Baxi and Ba (巴) commanderies. Liu Bei's army then advanced towards Yangping Pass. At the same time, Liu Bei also sent Zhang Fei, Ma Chao, Wu Lan, Lei Tong and Ren Kui to attack Wudu Commandery, and they garrisoned at Xiabian County. During this time, Leiding of the Di ethnic group led seven tribes to join Liu Bei. As for Cao Cao's side, Xiahou Yuan defended Yangping Pass, Zhang He and Xu Huang respectively guarded Guangshi and Mamingge, while Cao Hong and Cao Xiu led a separate force to resist Zhang Fei.

In 218, Zhang Fei and Ma Chao's army garrisoned at Gushan, where they spread news that they were going to blockade the enemy's retreat route. Cao Hong wanted to attack Wu Lan at Xiabian County, but the other officers were suspicious of Zhang Fei's movements. Cao Xiu thought that if Zhang Fei was really planning to seal their retreat route, he should keep his plan covert; now that Zhang Fei had overtly revealed his intention, they should make use of the opportunity to feign retreat and perform a frontal assault. Cao Hong agreed to Cao Xiu's tactic and attacked. Lei Tong and Ren Kui were killed in battle, while Wu Lan fled to join the Di tribes, where he was subsequently killed by a Di leader, Qiangduan. After their subordinate defeat, Zhang Fei and Ma Chao withdrew their army by around April 218.

On another front, Liu Bei was facing Xiahou Yuan at Yangping Pass. In around August 218, Liu Bei sent Chen Shi to attack Mamingge, but the latter was defeated by Xu Huang, and some of the fleeing soldiers fell into the deep valleys during their escape. Liu Bei personally led an assault on Zhang He at Guangshi but was unable to overcome his enemy. He then sent an urgent letter to Zhuge Liang in Yi Province's capital, Chengdu, to request for reinforcements. Zhuge Liang vacillated and consulted Yang Hong, who said, "Hanzhong is the throat of Yi Province. This is a critical point of survival and destruction. Without Hanzhong there will be no Shu (Yi Province). A disaster has befallen on the gates of our home. At this moment, the men should go to war, the women should help in transporting supplies, what's there to hesitate about sending reinforcements?" Zhuge Liang accepted Yang Hong's advice and sent reinforcements to Liu Bei while Liu Bei continued his standoff against Cao Cao's forces.

Turn of the tide

By October 218, Cao Cao moved from Ye city to Chang'an near Hanzhong Commandery to direct the defence against Liu Bei, but had been held up by internal problems including a major coup d'état and some local uprisings. In the meantime, Liu Bei and Xiahou Yuan had been locked in a stalemate for a year. In December 218, to break the deadlock, Liu Bei crossed the Mian River south of Yangping Pass and advanced towards Hanzhong Commandery through the mountains. Liu Bei's army set up camp at Mount Dingjun. In response, Xiahou Yuan and Zhang He led their forces out in an attempt to take control of higher ground, and they made camp at Zouma Valley. During the night, Liu Bei followed Huang Quan's plan and set fire to the enemy camp fences. Xiahou Yuan led a force to defend the southern flank while sending Zhang He to guard the eastern side. Liu Bei launched a direct assault on Zhang He and Zhang started to falter, so Xiahou Yuan despatched half of his forces to support Zhang. At this point, Fa Zheng told Liu Bei that it was an opportune time to attack. Liu Bei ordered his men to shout loudly and beat the drums, and sent Huang Zhong to charge at the enemy. The mettlesome soldiers of Huang Zhong broke through the enemy lines and slew Xiahou Yuan and Zhao Yong, while Zhang He fled with his surviving troops to north of the Han River, where they set up a camp.

As Cao Cao's forces had just lost their commander, Xiahou Yuan, a tempest ensued. Du Xi and Guo Huai regrouped their scattered troops and (unofficially) nominated Zhang He to replace Xiahou Yuan. Zhang He accepted and gave orders to his troops, restoring peace and order in his army. The following day, Liu Bei planned to cross the Han River and attack Zhang He, whose officers pointed out they were outnumbered, and suggested to Zhang He to set up camps along the banks of the Han River. Guo Huai felt that their forces were displaying weakness to the enemy by doing so, he proposed setting up camp far away from the river to lure the enemy to cross the shallow, during which they counterattack the enemy. Zhang He agreed with Guo Huai's idea and moved his camp further away from the river. Liu Bei became suspicious and did not dare to cross the river. In Chang'an, when Cao Cao heard that Xiahou Yuan had been killed in action, he despatched Cao Zhen with an army to reinforce their forces at Yangping Pass. When Cao Zhen arrived, he directed Xu Huang to attack Gao Xiang, an officer under Liu Bei. Xu Huang scored a victory and temporarily restored some morale for Cao Cao's side.

Battle of Han River

In February 219, Cao Cao personally led an army from Chang'an to Hanzhong Commandery via Xia Valley. Liu Bei was not worried, as he thought, "Even if Cao Cao came, he cannot do anything. I'll definitely take control of the Han River." Hence, Liu Bei gathered his forces and put up a firm defence, refusing to engage Cao Cao's army. Liu Bei focused on the Fabian strategy from this point forward. With each day passing, more and more Cao Cao's soldiers either deserted or died.

Later, when Cao Cao's forces were transporting supplies via Beishan, Huang Zhong led a force to rob the enemy's supplies, but had yet to return on time. Zhao Yun led ten horsemen out of camp in search of Huang Zhong and encountered Cao Cao's army. They were surrounded but Zhao Yun fought his way out and retreated back to camp with the enemy in pursuit. Upon reaching camp, Zhao Yun ordered the gates to be opened, flags and banners to be lowered, and the beating of war drums to be stopped. Cao Cao's men feared an ambush in the camp and turned back. Just then, Zhao Yun ordered his troops to beat the drums loudly and his archers to rain arrows on the enemy. Cao Cao's soldiers were thrown into confusion and trampled on each other as they attempted to flee, while many drowned as they tried to escape across the Han River.

As Cao Cao had been in a standoff against Liu Bei for several months and had been facing serious logistics problem, he eventually gave an order, "chicken rib". No one understood what Cao Cao meant when he said "chicken rib", except his registrar, Yang Xiu. Yang Xiu explained that it was a pity to discard a piece of chicken's rib even though it may not have much meat on it. This was an analogy to the situation Cao Cao was in: Cao Cao knew that he had little chance of defeating Liu Bei, but felt that it was a pity to abandon Hanzhong Commandery. By June 219, Cao Cao retreated back to Chang'an and gave up Hanzhong Commandery to Liu Bei.

Aftermath
A month after successfully conquering Hanzhong, Liu Bei sent Meng Da to attack Fangling Commandery via Zigui County. Meng Da defeated and killed Fangling Commandery's Administrator, Kuai Qi, and took control of the area. Liu Bei later sent his adopted son, Liu Feng, to attack Shangyong Commandery via the Mian River. Shangyong Commandery's Administrator, Shen Dan, surrendered to Liu Feng. In around August 219, Liu Bei declared himself "King of Hanzhong".

On the other hand, after withdrawing, Cao Cao was worried that Liu Bei might attack Wudu Commandery, so he ordered Zhang Ji, the Inspector of Yong Province, to relocate 50,000 Di people from Wudu Commandery to Fufeng and Tianshui commanderies.

Order of battle

Liu Bei forces
 Governor of Yi Province Liu Bei
 General Who Spreads Martial Might Fa Zheng
 Protector of the Army Huang Quan
 General Who Attacks Barbarians Huang Zhong
 General of the Standard Wei Yan
 Vice General of the Household in the Army Liu Feng
 Administrator of Yidu Meng Da
 Major General Chen Shi
 Gao Xiang
 Assisting General of the Army Zhao Yun
 Zhang Zhu
 Chief of Mianyang Zhang Yi
 General Who Attacks Barbarians Zhang Fei
 General Who Pacifies the West Ma Chao
  Wu Lan
  Lei Tong
  Ren Kui
Non-participants
 General of the Imperial Consular Zhuge Liang
 Attendant Clerk Yang Hong

Cao Cao forces
 Imperial Chancellor Cao Cao
 Protector of the Army Who Attacks Shu Cao Zhen
  Registrar Yang Xiu
  General Who Attacks the West Xiahou Yuan
  Inspector of Yi Province Zhao Yong
 General Who Defeats Bandits Zhang He
 Chief Commandant of Escorting Cavalry Du Xi
 Major Guo Huai
  Xiahou Rong
 Protector-General Cao Hong
 Cavalry Commandant of the Tiger and Leopard Cavalry Cao Xiu
 Palace Attendant Xin Pi
 Administrator of Wudu Yang Fu
 General Who Pacifies Bandits Xu Huang
  (Acting) Colonel Wang Ping
 Administrator of Ba Shire Yuan Yue
 Administrator of Eastern Ba Pu Hu
 Administrator of Western Ba Du Huo
  Administrator of Fangling (房陵太守) Kuai Qi
  Administrator of Shangyong (上庸太守) Shen Dan
Non-participants
Inspector of Yong Province (雍州刺史) Zhang Ji

Notes

References

 Chen, Shou. Records of the Three Kingdoms (Sanguozhi).
 Chang Qu (4th century). Chronicles of Huayang (Huayang Guo Zhi).
 Fang, Xuanling. Book of Jin (Jin Shu).
 Pei, Songzhi. Annotations to Records of the Three Kingdoms (Sanguozhi zhu).
 Sima, Guang. Zizhi Tongjian.

Rebellions during the end of the Han dynasty
Military history of Shaanxi
210s conflicts